Batura III, also known as Batura Muztagh III, is a  peak in Batura Muztagh, Pakistan, which is the westernmost subrange of the Karakoram range.

Location

Batura III lies in the Batura Muztagh, which is a part of the Karakoram range, lying west of the Hunza River. Together with Batura I, Batura II, Batura IV, and other lower peaks, Batura II forms part of the Batura Wall.

See also
List of mountains in Pakistan

References 

Seven-thousanders of the Karakoram
Mountains of Gilgit-Baltistan